The 2018 SEC Championship Game was played on Saturday, December 1, 2018, in the Mercedes-Benz Stadium in Atlanta, Georgia, to determine the 2018 football champion of the Southeastern Conference (SEC). The game featured the East Division champion Georgia against the West Division champion Alabama. Georgia, the East Division Champion, was the designated home team. The game was  televised by CBS for the eighteenth straight year. Alabama came back from a 28–14 deficit in the third quarter to defeat Georgia, 35–28.

2017 season
In the 2017 SEC Championship Game,  the East champion Georgia defeated the West champion Auburn 28–7 in a rematch from three weeks prior where Auburn defeated Georgia 40–17. It was the first time since 2008 an East Division team won the SEC Championship.

Teams

Alabama
Also on November 3, Alabama secured its spot in the title game by defeating LSU by a score of 29–0. This gave Alabama a two-game lead over LSU in the West Division, with the Crimson Tide holding the potential tiebreaker. LSU then lost 74-72 to Texas A&M in the final game of the regular season, thus meaning Alabama had won every possible tiebreaker.

Georgia
Georgia won its November 3 game against Kentucky, securing the East Division. While Georgia could have finished in a tie for the division title with any combination of Kentucky and Florida, Georgia also defeated Florida during the season, giving the Bulldogs all possible divisional tiebreakers. The Bulldogs ultimately won the East title by two games.

Alabama vs. Georgia series history
This match up was the 69th all time meeting against the Crimson Tide and Bulldogs. They last played each other last season for the College Football Playoff National Championship . Alabama defeated Georgia, in overtime, 26–23. After the January 8, 2018 match up, Alabama leads the all time series 39–25–4. This match up was the first time since 2012, that the two teams face off in the conference title game.

Game summary

Scoring summary

Statistics

Note: 77,141 was the officially announced attendance figure; "turnstile count" subsequently reported as 69,614.

See also
 Alabama–Georgia football rivalry

References

Championship Game
SEC Championship Game
Alabama Crimson Tide football games
Georgia Bulldogs football games
December 2018 sports events in the United States
2018 in sports in Georgia (U.S. state)
2018 in Atlanta